William George Hylton Jolliffe, 1st Baron Hylton  (7 December 1800 – 1 June 1876), known as Sir William Jolliffe, Bt, between 1821 and 1866, was a British soldier and Conservative politician. He was a member of the Earl of Derby's first two administrations as Under-Secretary of State for the Home Department in 1852 and as Parliamentary Secretary to the Treasury between 1858 and 1859.

Background
Jolliffe was the son of Reverend William John Jolliffe, the son of William Jolliffe and his wife Eleanor Hylton, daughter and heir of Sir Richard Hylton, 5th Baronet (who had assumed the surname of Hylton in lieu of his patronymic Musgrave; see Musgrave Baronets) and his wife Anne, sister and co-heiress of John Hylton, de jure 18th Baron Hylton. Jolliffe first served in the Army and achieved the rank of captain in the 15th Dragoons. He notably took part in the events at St Peter's Field in Manchester in 1819 (the "Peterloo Massacre"). In 1821, at the age of twenty, Jolliffe was created a Baronet, of Merstham in the County of Surrey.

Political career
Jolliffe served a year as High Sheriff of Surrey in 1830 and then sat as a Member of Parliament for Petersfield from 1830 to 1832, 1837 to 1838 and 1841 to 1866 and served under the Earl of Derby as Under-Secretary of State for the Home Department in 1852 and as Parliamentary Secretary to the Treasury from 1858 to 1859. He was admitted to the Privy Council in 1859 and in 1866 he was raised to the peerage as Baron Hylton, of Hylton in the County Palatine of Durham and of Petersfield in the County of Southampton.

Cricket
Jolliffe played a single first-class match for Hampshire in 1825 against Sussex. Jolliffe scored 12 runs in the match.

Family
Lord Hylton married, firstly, Eleanor Paget, daughter of the Hon. Berkeley Thomas Paget, in 1825. Their eldest son Hylton Jolliffe was a captain in the Coldstream Guards but died from cholera during the Crimean War. Hylton married, secondly, Sophia Penelope, daughter of Sir Robert Sheffield, 4th Baronet, and widow of William Fox-Strangways, 4th Earl of Ilchester, in 1867. He died at Merstham House near Reigate on 1 June 1876, aged 75, and was succeeded in his titles by his second but eldest surviving son from his first marriage, Hedworth. His granddaughter Gertrude Crawford became the first commandant of the Women's Royal Air Force.

References

External links 
 
 
 

1800 births
1876 deaths
15th The King's Hussars officers
Members of the Privy Council of the United Kingdom
Barons in the Peerage of the United Kingdom
Conservative Party (UK) MPs for English constituencies
UK MPs 1830–1831
UK MPs 1831–1832
UK MPs 1837–1841
UK MPs 1841–1847
UK MPs 1847–1852
UK MPs 1852–1857
UK MPs 1857–1859
UK MPs 1859–1865
UK MPs 1865–1868
UK MPs who were granted peerages
English cricketers
Hampshire cricketers
High Sheriffs of Surrey
English cricketers of 1787 to 1825
William
Peers of the United Kingdom created by Queen Victoria